UID may refer to:

Identifying numbers
 Unique identifier and instances or systems thereof

In computing
 Unique identifier for a specific user of a computer system 
 Unique ID for the Mifare series of chips (integrated circuits) used in contactless smart cards and proximity cards. 
 Unique ID of a message in a folder on an IMAP server
 User identifier (Unix), a code identifying each user on a Unix and Unix-like systems
 Globally unique identifier (GUID)
 Universally unique identifier (UUID)

In other areas
 PubMed 'Unique Identifier' parameter (PMID) designating specific scientific publication abstracts (PubMed § PubMed identifier)
 'Unique Item Identifier', a specific value in the IUID (Item Unique Identification) system used by the United States Department of Defense for the identification of accountable equipment according to DoD Instruction 5000.64
 Aadhaar number, originally the Unique Identification Number, an initiative of the Unique Identification Authority of India (UIDAI) of the Indian government to create a unique ID for every Indian resident
 uID Center, a nonprofit organization in Tokyo, Japan, responsible for the Ucode system for uniquely identifying real-world objects electronically
 German for: "UID = Umsatzsteuer Identifikation" (English: VAT identification number, VAT = value-added tax)

Organizations
 Ulster Institute for the Deaf
 Umeå Institute of Design
 Unitedworld Institute of Design, college in India

Other uses
 Unidentified decedent, a deceased person whose body has not yet been identified
 Unintelligent Design, a satirical reaction to the Intelligent Design movement
 Unit Identification, an LED used as a means of locating a specific computer server in a server room
 Universal Instructional Design, an educational method that tries to deliver teaching to meet the needs of wide variety of learners
 User interface design, device design with the focus on the user's experience and interaction

See also
IUD